Edwin García (born July 10, 1982) is a retired Colombian  football defender.

Titles

References

1982 births
Living people
Association football defenders
Deportivo Pereira footballers
Once Caldas footballers
Millonarios F.C. players
La Equidad footballers
Deportivo Pasto footballers
Águilas Doradas Rionegro players
Colombian footballers
People from Pereira, Colombia